Alpo may refer to:

 Alpo, a village in the comune of Villafranca di Verona in Italy
 Alpo (pet food)
 Alpo Rusi, diplomat
 Alpo Suhonen (born 1948), hockey coach
 Association of Lunar and Planetary Observers

See also
 Alpos